Henry or Henrie Anthonie Jetto (1569/70 —  30 August 1627) was a black English yeoman, the earliest-known black person with an extant will in England and the earliest to have resided in Worcestershire.

Biography
Jetto first appears in records on 3 March 1596, when, at age twenty-six, he was baptised at St Martin's Church, Holt, Worcestershire. This, alongside his adult baptism, indicates he was very probably of foreign origin. He initially resided on the estate of the local landowner Sir Henry Bromley of Holt Castle, where he was first recorded as "belonging to Henry Bromley". In 1607, he had become Bromley's gardener.

Sir Henry Bromley had attended the Masque at the baptism of Prince Henry at Stirling Castle in August 1594 which featured a black actor.

Jetto wife's will refers to him as "Johnanes Jetto of Holt in the country of Worcestershire yeoman". According to biographer Onyeka Nubia, "Jetto’s status as a yeoman is highly significant". Such a position would have afforded Jetto the privilege of voting in local elections - making Jetto the first African to vote in England - as well giving him much personal sway in local court cases. It also points towards Jetto's status as an independent and affluent black Briton, having risen from Bromley's employment to a senior position in the county's hierarchy, which required Jetto to hold no less than 40s worth of land.

Jetto composed his own will, and signed it on 20 September 1626. This document is an important source for Jetto's biography - showing his literacy and wealth. According to Onyeka, the document is also "very important as it was one of the few [documents] written by an African in early modern Europe", and in fact the first will to be written by an African in Europe. The will contains legacies bequeathed to Jetto's children, and grandchildren, totaling to £17 15s 8d, and was executed on 13 September 1638.

Family and death
Henry married Persida, "a maid". Unlike Henry, Persida's race is not recorded in contemporary records. Henry predeceased Persida, and was buried in St Martin's, Holt on 30 August 1627. Persida was buried on 7 July 1640.

Both Henry and Persida's wills mention their five children: Sarah, Margaret, John, Helena and Richard, all of whom were baptised in Holt between 1598 and 1608. Henry's will mentions one illegitimate child among his beneficiaries - "John the Cuthbert". Genealogical research has revealed 8 children, 32 grandchildren, and over 70 great-grandchildren descended from Jetto. Jetto's will contains a threat towards two of his more unruly children, Richard and Margaret, over their portions of the inheritance:

Jetto's descendants have been traced throughout England - in Birmingham, Bristol, Cheshire, Durham, Manchester, and Surrey - as well as in Australia and in the United States, though the ethnic connotations of the surname provoked later generations to change the name to "Jetter".

Legacy

Jetto was rediscovered in 2007 by a distant descendant, Martin Bluck, researching his family history in the Worcestershire History Centre when he discovered the records of Jetto's baptism and burial. The local newspaper Worcester News reported on the find as "the earliest known reference to a black person living in Worcestershire". In this news report the local archivist, Louisa Mann, described it as an "extremely exciting discovery": 

Black British historian Onyeka Nubia undertook much genealogical research into Jetto. He interviewed the living descendants of Jetto on their ancestors, and discovered Jetto's will. In his 2013 book Blackamoores, Onyeka cites Jetto among several black Tudors, in an argument for their prevalence in English history; he retrospectively named Jetto's will "one of the most important documents" in the book, a remarkably early document by an African in Europe. In an Oxford Dictionary of National Biography release dedicated to expounding the new research on the "wide spectrum of people of African origin living in Britain across the sixteenth to eighteenth centuries", released in October 2019 for UK Black History Month, Jetto was among the 23 new black biographies added to the Dictionary. Onyeka authored Jetto's biography in the release.

References

Sources

Further reading
 

1627 deaths
17th-century African people
Black British history
People from Malvern Hills District
English gardeners